Laura Maria Sheldon Wright (July 10, 1809January 21, 1886) was an American missionary.

Laura Maria Sheldon was born on July 10, 1809, in St. Johnsbury, Vermont. She grew up in St. Johnsbury and in Barnet, Vermont, and was educated at the Young Ladies' School.

She married Asher Wright on January 21, 1833, and the two moved to Buffalo Creek Reservation on February 5, 1833, to begin their mission. As a missionary, Laura wrote a school primer in Seneca and English and worked as a teacher. She also founded an organization called the Iroquois Temperance League.

She died of pneumonia on January 21, 1886, in Iroquois, New York, at the home of Nicholson Henry Parker (1819–1892), a Seneca interpreter.

References 

1809 births
1886 deaths
19th-century American women writers
American Christian missionaries
People from St. Johnsbury, Vermont
19th-century American non-fiction writers
American women non-fiction writers
American textbook writers
Women textbook writers
19th-century American educators
19th-century American women educators
Female Christian missionaries
Writers from Vermont
Educators from Vermont
Deaths from pneumonia in New York (state)